"What I Had with You" is a song written by Sonny Throckmorton and Curly Putman. It has been recorded by several country artists, including Jean Shepard and Slim Whitman in 1974, and Tammy Wynette in 1977, Sheila Andrews with guest vocals from Joe Sun in 1979, and most notably John Conlee in January 1981. Conlee's version was released as the third and final single from his album Friday Night Blues and reached number 12 on the Billboard Hot Country Singles chart.

Chart performance

Sheila Andrews

John Conlee

References

1979 singles
1981 singles
1979 songs
John Conlee songs
Sheila Andrews songs
Joe Sun songs
Songs written by Curly Putman
Songs written by Sonny Throckmorton
MCA Records singles